Didymopogon is a monotypic genus of flowering plants in the family Rubiaceae. The genus contains only one species, viz. Didymopogon sumatranum, which is endemic to western Sumatra.

References

External links 
 Didymopogon in the World Checklist of Rubiaceae

Monotypic Rubiaceae genera